Barnaby Clay (born 15 May 1973) is a British film and music video director.

Career
Clay graduated London International Film School in 1996, directing the school's entry to the Fuji Film Scholarship Awards – the short film Justice in Mind, took home the top award of Best Film. Soon after leaving film school he moved into directing music videos and commercials. He has directed music videos for bands including Jon Spencer Blues Explosion, TV on the Radio, Gnarls Barkley, the Yeah Yeah Yeahs, and Dave Gahan. 

In 2003 Clay traveled to Russia with the gypsy punk band Menlo Park to make his first documentary for Britain's Channel 4
entitled Greetings From Beartown. In 2005 he wrote and directed a short film for Ritz Fine Jewellery titled Carousel, starring Chloe Sevigny.

In 2007 his fantasy horror short, Finkle's Odyssey, won the Méliès d'Argent at Fantsporto Film Festival, also collecting awards at Brooklyn International Film Festival, Marvais Genre, IFCT, 24 FPS Film Festival. 

In 2011, Clay re-worked Mick Rock's music video for David Bowie's "Life On Mars". The installation was a part of Vice Media and Intel's Creators Project series, traveling globally under the name 'Life On Mars Revisited'.

Clay directed the Vice Films full-length feature documentary entitled Shot! The Psycho-Spiritual Mantra of Rock (2017).

Personal life 
In 2007, Clay moved to New York City, where he met Karen O, lead singer of the band Yeah Yeah Yeahs. The two were married in December 2011. Their son Django was born in August 2015.

Clay continues to collaborate with his wife, including directing a music video for her first solo record, Crush Songs.

References

External links
 
 Barney Clay

1973 births
Alumni of the London Film School
British documentary film directors
British expatriates in the United States
British film directors
British film designers
British music video directors
Living people